Sandspit is the largest community on Moresby Island, in Haida Gwaii off the Pacific coast of British Columbia, Canada. The only town on Moresby Island, Sandspit has accommodations, a campground, supermarket and 85-berth harbour serving visitors to Gwaii Haanas.

The unincorporated community had a population of 296 as of the 2016 census, down from 297 in 2011.  The community is served by Sandspit Airport with daily flights to and from Vancouver, as well as multiple ferry voyages from Alliford Bay to Skidegate Landing on Graham Island.

Near the airport is the "Spirit of Sandspit", a copper and cedar sculpture of a salmon by island artist Lon Sharp dominates the main road. Sandspit is also home to the Open Ocean totem pole by Jesse Jones, Jimmy Jones and Jason Goetzinger.

The Circle Tour leaves and returns to Sandspit on active gravel logging road past Skidegate Lake, Copper River, Gray Bay beach, and Copper Bay, where traditional Haida people fish for sockeye salmon and hang the fish out to dry in May and early June.

Climate
Sandspit experiences an oceanic (Köppen Cfb) with a rainy season in the colder months, typical for the Pacific Northwest. It is very warm for its high latitude in North America, and its annual average temperature is the same as Port Hardy, which is located almost 3 degrees further south.

References

External links

Sandspit unincorporated place, Skeena-Queen Charlotte Regional District Electoral Area E, British Columbia; Statistics Canada

Populated places in Haida Gwaii
Sandspit
Designated places in British Columbia